The West Usambara two-horned chameleon or West Usambara blade-horned chameleon (Kinyongia multituberculata) is a chameleon endemic to the West Usambara Mountains of Tanzania. Until 2008, it was generally confused with Fischer's chameleon (K. fischeri), which is not found in the Usambara Mountains. Another related species, K. vosseleri, occurs in the same range as K. multituberculata, while K. matschiei is restricted to the East Usambaras.

Habitat and conservation
It can also occur in modified vegetation adjacent to forest patches and on shrubs and trees by roadsides. However, it requires structurally complex habitats and does not range across transformed landscapes.

The forest patches suffer from timber removal and resource utilization, and habitat is being lost to encroachment and transformation for agriculture. The habitat is highly fragmented, and  better protection of forest reserves is needed. This species is estimated to be one of the most heavily exported chameleons from East Africa for international pet trade.

See also
Trioceros deremensis, the Usambara three-horned chameleon

Gallery

References

Kinyongia
Reptiles of Tanzania
Endemic fauna of Tanzania
Reptiles described in 1913
Taxa named by Fritz Nieden